Sharon Jacobson (born August 3, 1983) is an American mixed martial artist. She  competed in strawweight division of the Invicta Fighting Championships (Invicta).

Background 

Jacobson started wrestling at the age of sixteen and won two national championships.
After graduating from the university, Jacobson joined the United States Army through World Class Athlete Program. She transitioned to mixed martial arts in 2012.

Mixed martial arts career

Early career
Jacobson amassed a record of 2-1 under Showdown Fights, Xplode Fight Series and No Mercy Extreme Fighting prior signed by Invicta.

Invicta Fighting Championships
Jacobson made her debut at Invicta on April 24, 2015, at Invicta FC: Kankaanpää vs. Souza against Delaney Owen. She won the fight via unanimous decision.

On her second fight in Invicta, she faced  Jamie Moyle on September 12, 2015, at Invicta FC: Evinger vs. Kianzad. She won the fight via unanimous decision.

On August 31, 2017, Jacobson faced Kali Robbins at Invicta FC: Kunitskaya vs. Pa'aluhi. She lost the fight in round one via an armbar.

Jacobson defeated Ashley Nichols on January 13, 2018, at Invicta FC: Kaufman vs. Kianzad.

Championships and accomplishments

Wrestling 
 National women's freestyle champion at 121 pounds in 2008

Personal life 
Jacobson serves as a  Sergeant in the United States army as a Horizontal Construction Engineer.

Mixed martial arts record

|-
|Loss
|align=center|6–5
|Kailin Curran
|Decision (unanimous)
| rowspan=2|Invicta Phoenix Series 1
| rowspan=2|
|align=center|1
|align=center|5:00
| rowspan=2|Kansas City, Kansas, United States
|Invicta FC Strawweight Tournament Semifinal.
|-
|Win
|align=center|6–4
|Amber Brown
|Decision (unanimous)
|align=center|1
|align=center|5:00
|Invicta FC Strawweight Tournament Quarterfinal.
|-
|-
|Loss
|align=center|5–4
|Kay Hansen
|Submission (armbar)
|Invicta FC 33: Frey vs. Grusander II
|
|align=center|3
|align=center|4:43
|Kansas City, Missouri, United States
|
|-
|Loss
|align=center|5–3
|Emi Fujino
|Decision (unanimous)
|Pancrase 296
|
|align=center|3
|align=center|5:00
|Tokyo, Japan
|
|-
|Win
|align=center|5–2
|Ashley Nichols
|Decision (unanimous)
|Invicta FC 27: Kaufman vs. Kianzad
|
|align=center|3
|align=center|5:00
|Kansas City, Missouri, United States
|
|-
|Loss
|align=center|4–2
|Kali Robbins
|Submission (armbar)
|Invicta FC 25: Kunitskaya vs. Pa'aluhi
|
|align=center|1
|align=center|0:42
|Lemoore, California, United States
|
|-
|Win
|align=center|4–1
|Jamie Moyle
|Decision (unanimous)
|Invicta FC 14: Evinger vs. Kianzad
|
|align=center|3
|align=center|5:00
|Kansas City, Missouri, United States
|
|-
|Win
|align=center|3–1
|Delaney Owen
|Decision (unanimous)
|Invicta FC 12: Kankaanpää vs. Souza
|
|align=center|3
|align=center|5:00
|Kansas City, Missouri, United States
|
|-
|Win
|align=center|2–1
|Ashley Deen
|KO (punches)
|No Mercy Extreme Fighting: Annihilation 53
|
|align=center|1
|align=center|2:25
|Colorado Springs, Colorado, United States
|
|-
|Win
|align=center|1–1
|Katie Anita Runyan
|TKO (slam and punches)
|Xplode Fight Series: Cerebral
|
|align=center|1
|align=center|0:44
|Valley Center, California, United States
|
|-
|Loss
|align=center|0–1
|DeAnna Bennett
|Submission (rear-naked choke)
|Showdown Fights: Lopez vs. Castillo
|
|align=center|1
|align=center|2:12
|Orem, Utah, United States
|
|-

References

External links
 
 Sharon Jacobson at Invicta FC

1983 births
Living people
Sportspeople from El Cajon, California
Military personnel from California
American female mixed martial artists
Strawweight mixed martial artists
Mixed martial artists utilizing wrestling
Mixed martial artists utilizing boxing
Mixed martial artists utilizing Brazilian jiu-jitsu
American female sport wrestlers
Amateur wrestlers
American practitioners of Brazilian jiu-jitsu
Female Brazilian jiu-jitsu practitioners
21st-century American women
U.S. Army World Class Athlete Program